Declan Michael Martin Donnellan  (born 4 August 1953) is an English film/stage director and author. He co-founded the Cheek by Jowl theatre company with Nick Ormerod in 1981. In addition to his Cheek by Jowl productions, Donnellan has made theatre, opera and ballet with a variety of companies across the world.  In 1992, he received an honorary degree from the University of Warwick and in 2004 he was made a Chevalier de l'Ordre des Arts et des Lettres for his work in France. In 2010, he was made an honorary fellow of Goldsmiths' College, University of London. Donnellan was appointed Officer of the Order of the British Empire (OBE) in the 2017 Birthday Honours for services to theatre.

Biography
Donnellan was born in Manchester and grew up in Ealing, London. He was educated at St Benedict's School, Ealing and Queens' College, Cambridge, where he read English and Law. After leaving Cambridge, he was called to the Bar at Middle Temple in 1978.

He founded Cheek by Jowl with Nick Ormerod in 1981.<ref name=MC>"As he likes it", profile of Donnellan by Michael Coveney, The Guardian, 4 February 2006</ref> Since 2006 the company has been part of the Barbican's International Theatre Program (BITE) resulting in co-productions of The Changeling (2006), Cymbeline (2007) and Troilus and Cressida (2008).Cymbeline, review by Philip Fisher, British Theatre Guide, 2007 He has directed plays at the Royal Shakespeare Company, the English National Opera, the Old Vic and the Bolshoi Ballet, among others.

For the Royal Shakespeare Company he has directed The School for Scandal, King Lear (Academy 2002) and an adaptation of Great Expectations (2005) with Nick Ormerod. The cast of Great Expectations included Gwendoline Christie and Sian Phillips. He has also directed Le Cid for the Avignon Festival, Falstaff for the Salzburg Festival and the ballet of Romeo and Juliet for the Bolshoi Theatre in Moscow. Other work in Russia includes The Winter's Tale for the Maly Drama Theatre of Saint Petersburg.

In 1989, Donnellan was made Associate Director of the Royal National Theatre in London where his productions have included Fuenteovejuna, The Mandate and Sweeney Todd: The Demon Barber of Fleet Street (1993) The cast of Sweeny Todd included Alun Armstrong, Adrian Lester and Julia McKenzie. In 1993 Donnellan directed both parts of Angels in America, after having previously directed the play’s first part Millennium Approaches at the National’s Cottesloe Theatre in 1991. In 1993 the play’s second part, Perestroika, received its London debut at the National Theatre and was played in repertory with Millennium Approaches, starring Daniel Craig and Jason Isaacs.

In 2000 he formed a company of actors in Moscow, under the auspices of The Chekhov Festival, whose productions include Boris Godunov, Twelfth Night and Three Sisters. He wrote a play, Lady Betty, which was performed by Cheek by Jowl in 1989. He has also adapted Don't Fool with Love by Alfred de Musset, Antigone by Sophocles, The Mandate by Nikolai Erdman and Masquerade by Mikhail Lermontov. First published in Russian in 2001, Donnellan's book, The Actor and the Target, was published in English in 2002 (reprinted 2005), and has since appeared in 15 languages, including French, Spanish, Italian, German, Romanian and Mandarin.

He directed the 1992 short The Big Fish which starred Fiona Shaw. He directed the 2012 film Bel Ami, an adaption of the Maupassant novel; the film starred Robert Patinson, Uma Thurman, Kristin Scott Thomas, Christina Ricci and Colm Meaney.

Donnellan has won awards in London, Paris, New York and Moscow, including Laurence Olivier Awards for:

1987 Best Director for Le Cid, Twelfth Night and Macbeth1989/90 The Observer Award for Outstanding Achievement for Fuenteovejuna1994 Best Director of a Musical for Sweeney Todd: The Demon Barber of Fleet Street1995 Best Director of a Play for As You Like ItIn February 2004 he was made a Chevalier de l'Ordre des Arts et des Lettres for his work in France, and in 2009 he shared the Charlemagne award with Craig Venter and Archbishop Desmond Tutu.

In 2014, Donnellan directed the stage play of Shakespeare in Love (play) at the Noël Coward Theatre. The play was adapted for stage by Lee Hall (playwright) from the screenplay by Tom Stoppard and Marc Norman and produced by Disney Theatrical Productions and Sonia Friedman Productions. The production was designed by Donnellan’s co-Artistic Director of Cheek by Jowl theatre company, Nick Ormerod. The original cast included David Oakes as Christopher Marlowe, Paul Chahidi as Philip Henslowe and Anna Carteret as Elizabeth I. From January 2015, the cast included Eve Ponsonby as Viola de Lesseps, Orlando James as William Shakespeare and Suzanne Burden as Elizabeth I of England. Peter Moreton, who played Antigonus and the Old Shepherd in Cheek by Jowl’s The Winter’s Tale in 2015, played Richard Burbage in Shakespeare in Love, and Ryan Donaldson, who played Autolycus in the Cheek by Jowl’s The Winter’s Tale, played Edward Alleyn. Eve Ponsonby, Orlando James, Suzanne Burden and Peter Moreton had all previously worked with Cheek by Jowl in Tis Pity She’s a Whore. Eve Ponsonby played Annabella and Orlando James played her brother Giovanni in the 2014 revival. Suzanne Burden played Hippolita in 2011-2012, alongside Peter Moreton, who played the Cardinal and the Doctor.

In 2016, Donnellan won the Golden Lion of Venice for lifetime achievement in theatre at the Venice Biennale.

Stage productions

Cheek by Jowl
1981 The Country Wife (William Wycherley)
1982 Othello (William Shakespeare)
1983 Vanity Fair adapted by Donnellan from William Makepeace Thackeray – premiere
1984 Pericles (William Shakespeare)
1985 A Midsummer Night's Dream (William Shakespeare)
1985 Andromache (Jean Racine) – British premiere
1985 The Man of Mode (George Etherege)
1986 Le Cid (Pierre Corneille) – British premiere
1986 Twelfth Night (William Shakespeare)
1987 Macbeth (William Shakespeare)
1988 A Family Affair (Alexander Ostrovsky) – British premiere
1988 Philoctetes (Sophocles)
1988 The Tempest (William Shakespeare)
1989 Lady Betty (Declan Donnellan) – British premiere
1989 The Doctor of Honour (El médico de su honra) (Pedro Calderon) – British premiere
1990 Hamlet (William Shakespeare)
1990 Sara (Gotthold Ephraim Lessing) – British premiere
1991 As You Like It (William Shakespeare)
1993 Don't Fool With Love (Alfred de Musset)
1993 The Blind Men (Michel de Ghelderode) – British premiere
1994 As You Like It (William Shakespeare) – revival
1994 Measure for Measure (William Shakespeare)
1995 The Duchess of Malfi (John Webster)
1997 Out Cry (Tennessee Williams) – British premiere
1998 Much Ado About Nothing (William Shakespeare)
2002 Homebody/Kabul (Tony Kushner) – British premiere
2004 Othello (William Shakespeare)
2005 Great Expectations (adapted from Charles Dickens)
2006 The Changeling (Thomas Middleton and William Rowley)
2007 Cymbeline (William Shakespeare)
2007 Three Sisters (Anton Chekhov)
2008 Boris Godunov (Alexander Pushkin)
2008 Troilus and Cressida (William Shakespeare)
2009 Macbeth (William Shakespeare)
2011 'Tis Pity She's a Whore (John Ford)
2013 Ubu Roi (Alfred Jarry)
2014 Measure for Measure (William Shakespeare)
2015 The Winter's Tale (William Shakespeare)
2018 Pericles, Prince of Tyre (William Shakespeare)
2018 The Revenger's Tragedy (Thomas Middleton)

 Other 
1990 Peer Gynt, Royal National Theatre
1993 Sweeney Todd: The Demon Barber of Fleet Street, Royal National Theatre
1996 Martin Guerre, West End
1999 Hay Fever, Savoy Theatre
2000 Boris Godunov at the Moscow Art Theatre
2002 King Lear with the RSC Academy Company
2005 Great Expectations, with the RSC, a new adaptation by Declan Donnellan and Nick OrmerodThe Winter's Tale for the Maly Theater of St PetersburgLe Cid at the Avignon Festival with French actorsFalstaff at the Salzburg Festival
 Bel Ami
2014 Shakespeare in Love, Noël Coward Theatre
2015  Hamlet, Bolshoi Theatre

Bibliography
Donnellan, D. The Actor and the Target (English edition) Nick Hern Books, London, 2002Approaching the Millennium: Essays on Angels in America, eds. Deborah R. Geis and Steven F. Kruger University of Michigan Press, Ann Arbor, Michigan, 1997
Reade, Simon. Cheek by Jowl: Ten Years of Celebration, Oberon Books (hardback) 1991 – currently out of print
Irvin, Polly. Directing the Stage, RotoVision, Hove, 2003In Contact With the Gods?, Directors Talk Theatre, eds. Maria M. Delgado & Paul Heritage, Manchester University Press, Manchester, 1996
National Theatre Platform Papers No. 2 on Angels in America, National Theatre Publications Department
National Theatre Platform Papers, Declan Donnellan Talks About his Book, The Actor and the Target, National Theatre Publications Department, London, 24 January 2003On Directing'', eds. Mary Luckhurst and Gabriella Giannachi, Faber, London 1999
Albricker, Vinícius.  "A fala cênica sob o entrelaçamento dos princípios e procedimentos de Konstantin Stanislávski e Declan Donnellan., Belo Horizonte: Masters dissertation (Mestrado em Arte e Tecnologia da Imagem) – Escola de Belas Artes, Federal University of Minas Gerais, 2014.
Albricker, Vinícius. Variações rítmicas vivas na atuação cênica. Orientador: Ernani de Castro Maletta. 2019. Tese (Doutorado em Artes) – Escola de Belas Artes, Universidade Federal de Minas Gerais, Belo Horizonte Federal University of Minas Gerais, 2019. Disponível em: https://repositorio.ufmg.br/handle/1843/30684

See also
List of theatre directors in the 20th and 21st centuries

References

External links
Cheek by Jowl official website
 
 

Living people
1953 births
Writers from Manchester
English theatre directors
People educated at St Benedict's School, Ealing
Alumni of Queens' College, Cambridge
Chevaliers of the Ordre des Arts et des Lettres
Laurence Olivier Award winners
Officers of the Order of the British Empire